Bhuvanagiri Fort is a Fort located in Bhuvanagiri, Yadadri Bhuvanagiri District, Telangana, India. It is located on a huge rock at a commanding height.

History
The Bhongir fort adorns the place from the time it was built in 10th century. Bhongir Fort was built on an isolated monolithic rock by the Western Chalukya ruler Tribhuvanamalla Vikramaditya IV in the year 1076  and was thus named after him as Tribhuvanagiri, later it was called as Bhuvanagiri. Some of the inscriptions found in the fort were in Kannada and Telugu language highlighting the lifestyle of the people of that era. The inscriptions, the architecture and some sculptures found in the fort reveal that the fort was ruled by the Chalukya dynasty for a long time and then by the Kakatiya dynasty. The stone wall, the steps through the granite archways and the crumbling stucco ruins of the later age, still adorn the place.

Somewhere in 15th century, the fort was ceded to the Bahamani Sultans and then was taken over by a local governor. The Qutb Shahis' used the fort as a prison for those who aspired to snatch their throne. During the time of the British, the fort escaped their attention and was not occupied. Bhuvanagiri was much ignored after the downfall of the Nizams at the time of communist revolution in the late 1940s.

The Fort
Bhongir sits on a unique egg-shaped rock hill more than 500 feet high. The steps from the bottom of the hill to the top are still intact; at the beginning of the steps there is a Hanuman Temple with two entry points protected by huge rocks, so the fort was considered practically impregnable by invading armies. The splendid historical fort with the awe-inspiring rock and the aesthetically fortified courts which have stood the ravages of time stir the imagination of tourists. A moat that encircles the fort, a vast underground chamber, trap doors, an armoury, stables, ponds, wells, etc., make for fascinating viewing. The view from the top of the surrounding of the neighbouring area. The fort is associated with the rule of the heroic queen Rudramadevi and the countryside is simply breathtaking. The Bala Hisar or citadel on the top of the hill gives a bird's eye view. Rumour has it that there once was an underground corridor connecting Bhongir Fort to Golconda Fort. There is a statue placed at entry of the fort which came out in nearby diggings around fort. It is a popular trekking spot.

Nearest Cities 
Hyderabad-49 km
Nalgonda-70 km
Warangal-99 km
Suryapet-106 km
Khammam-164 km
Nizamabad-181 km

See also
Kakatiyas
Warangal Fort
Golconda Fort

References

External links

 Bhongir Fort - Gallery

Tourist attractions in Nalgonda district
Forts in Telangana